Terada Yushi (January 27, 1851 – March 14, 1917) was a Japanese politician who served as governor of Tottori Prefecture (1901-1906), Okayama Prefecture (1906-1908), Miyagi Prefecture (1908-1913) and Hiroshima Prefecture from February 1913 to April 1916.

Governors of Hiroshima
1851 births
1917 deaths
Japanese Home Ministry government officials
Governors of Tottori Prefecture
Governors of Okayama Prefecture
Governors of Miyagi Prefecture